Smith Island is an island of the Andaman Islands. It belongs to the North and Middle Andaman administrative district, part of the Indian union territory of Andaman and Nicobar Islands.

Geography
The island is located in Aerial Bay, near Diglipur.

Administration
Politically, Smith Island, along with the neighboring Aerial Bay Islands, is part of Diglipur Taluk.

Transportation
Ferry service is available from Aerial bay jetty or Kalipur water sports center. Normally ship is available once a week.

Demographics 
There are 3 villages on the island.
According to the 2011 census of India, the Island has 160 households. 
The main village has 60 households, with Eco rest houses which are available for overnight stay. 
The effective literacy rate (i.e. the literacy rate of population excluding children aged 6 and below) is 100%.

Fauna
Smith island is home to the Olive Ridley turtles which means, being the right place at the right time, one can even witness the turtle nesting.

References 

Cities and towns in North and Middle Andaman district
Islands of North and Middle Andaman district
Islands of India
Populated places in India
Islands of the Bay of Bengal